Halim Muslim PG College is an educational institution in Kanpur of Uttar Pradesh state in India. The college was established in 1959 by the Muslim Association in Kanpur. by Hafiz Mohammad Haleem (1856–1939), who was inspired by the noble ideas of Syed Ahmad Khan, the founder of Aligarh Muslim University. He donated his own land for a madrasa and later on, it was converted into school and college.

Departments 

The departments offering courses include:
English
Hindi
Urdu
Commerce
Economics
History
Political Science
Sociology
Physical Education
Teacher Education

Courses

Bachelor’s Degree Programmes 
Bachelor of Arts 
Bachelor of Commerce
Bachelor of Education

Post Graduate Degree Programmes 
Master of Arts

See also
 List of universities in India
 Universities and colleges in India
 Education in India
 Distance Education Council
 University Grants Commission (India)

References

External links 
 

Postgraduate colleges in Uttar Pradesh
Universities and colleges in Kanpur
Educational institutions established in 1959
1959 establishments in Uttar Pradesh